The local assembly of bishops is the Episcopal Conference of Gabon (French: Episcopal Conférence du Gabon, CEG).
The ECG is a member of the Association of Episcopal Conferences of the Region of Central Africa and Symposium of Episcopal Conferences of Africa and Madagascar (SECAM).

List of presidents of the Bishops' Conference:

1970 - 1981: André Fernand Anguilé, Archbishop of Libreville

1981 - 1989: Félicien-Patrice Makouaka, Bishop of Franceville

1989 - 2005: Basile Mve Engone, Bishop of Oyem and Archbishop of Libreville

2005 - ... : Timothée Modibo-Nzockena, Bishop of Franceville

See also
Catholic Church in Gabon

References

External links
 https://web.archive.org/web/20120713090802/http://www.eglisecatholique.ga/fr/index.php
 http://www.gcatholic.org/dioceses/country/GA.htm
 http://www.catholic-hierarchy.org/country/ga.html 

Gabon
Catholic Church in Gabon
Religious organizations based in Gabon

it:Chiesa cattolica in Gabon#Conferenza episcopale